Myanmar Union Adventist Seminary is a private Christian college located in Mosokwin Road, Myaungmya, about  west of Yangon, the Yangon International Airport of Myanmar. The 56.00 acre estate and the site of the campus provide a conductive environment to learning and mediation. It is the only tertiary education institution serving Myanmar Union Mission. It is a part of the  Seventh-day Adventist education system, the world's second largest Christian school system.

History
Myanmar Union Adventist Seminary is located on Mosokwin Road, Myaung Mya, Ayarwaddy Region, and 137 miles from Yangon. The college sits on 56-acre property with paddy fields and gardening areas. It is situated on the route of Yangon-Pathein waterway. It is accredited college by Adventist Accrediting Association, Maryland, US, and is the only college of Myanmar Union Mission, Myanmar.

Union Bible Seminary
Myanmar Union Adventist Seminary, formerly known as the Union Bible Seminary, started as a small Seventh-day Adventist Mission School in 1938 at Myaung Mya to provide Christian education for young people of Myanmar. In 1960, under the direction of Elder W. W. Christensen, progenitor of Seminary program, 15 denominational workers, mostly under high school graduates, enrolled for a two-year training course. They were the first batch of graduates from the school in 1962.

During the 1970s, the school experienced steady growth as it offered courses for high school students who came from all parts of Myanmar due to Sabbath problem in government schools. In 1974, the school offered three-year curriculum – Ministerial Training Course for high-school graduates and two-year curriculum; Bible Instructor Training Course for those who do not pass high school to meet the urgent needs of mission fields. MTC was equivalent to junior college level. The first graduates received their diplomas in 1977.
After the school had adopted the plus-two program of Southern Asia Division Education system in 1982, a three-year curriculum was reduced to junior college level curriculum in 1986.

Myanmar Union Adventist Seminary
In 1991, MUAS introduced a four-year curriculum for Bachelor of Arts in Religion with the approval of the Board of Seminary. In addition, the Seminary was authorized to offer two-year program for Certificate in Teaching Ministry in 1991. In 1996, the College Board approved additional expansion of industrial arts, business, and education departments and termination of plus-two program with the intent to offer pure collegiate major courses. Thus the college offered courses for Bachelor of Arts in religion, Bachelor of Arts in education, Bachelor of Business Administration, and Bachelor of Applied Arts in industry and minor in office administration. In 1998, the college added another minor course of Home Science and English. In 1999, Bachelor of Applied Arts in industry was reduced to a minor and Health Education minor was offered. In 2001, it was felt by the majority members of the College Board that the G 12 program in Secondary Academy is essential in our education program to meet the standard of present educational system of Adventist Education. Therefore, Myanmar Union Adventist Seminary must provide for G 12 program and for a four-year degree program. This means that a student receives a bachelor's degree after a minimum of seventeen [11+2+4] years of schooling.(This program commenced with the 2001 – 2002 school year.

Demonym
The demonym "MUAS' has been used for many years by MUAS faculty, staff and alumni. Students frequently use it when they are off-campus, and it is more official than informal.

Mission statement
The Myanmar Union Adventist Seminary is an Adventist institution of higher learning in Myanmar which is committed to prepare young people for the service of God and man through quality Christian education for this life and the life to come.

Academics

Undergraduate School
Bachelor of Arts in Religion
Bachelor of Theology
Bachelor of Arts in Education, majors in
General Education
Elementary Education
Bachelor of Arts in Business Administration, majors in
Accounting
Management

Publications
MUAS publishes weekly newsletter called "Flashpoint".

See also

List of Seventh-day Adventist colleges and universities
 Seventh-day Adventist education
List of seminaries and theological colleges in Myanmar

References

External links
 Official website

Seventh-day Adventist education
Educational institutions established in 1960
Christian colleges in Myanmar
Ayeyarwady Region